Stadionul Comunal is a multi-use stadium in Afumați, Romania. It is currently used mostly for football matches and is the home ground of CS Afumați. The stadium holds 3,000 people.

References

Football venues in Romania
CS Afumați